Cortec Group, founded in 1984, is a private equity firm based in New York City which focuses on investing with families, entrepreneurs and management teams to help them grow their companies.

Description 
Cortec Group targets leading middle-market specialty consumer, business-to-business, distribution and healthcare products and services businesses in partnership with owners and management teams who want to work with Cortec to drive growth and improve business fundamentals.

Since inception, the firm has raised nearly $5 billion of capital across seven investment funds and has completed more than 100 transactions ranging in size from $25 million to $400 million in purchase prices for its platform investments.

History
Cortec Group was founded in 1984 by senior managers of Condec Corporation, then a publicly traded industrial conglomerate. Originally the Consolidated Diesel Electric Company, Condec Corporation was founded in 1942 by Norman I. Schafler, and became a leading manufacturer of robotics, defense, aerospace, and industrial equipment. Condec operated a diversified portfolio of manufacturing companies.

Cortec was founded by Scott Schafler (Norman's son), Gerald Rosenberg, and Neal Kayes. Beginning in 1999, the firm was co-led by Mr. Schafler, David Schnadig and Jeff Lipsitz.  Coincident with the first and final closing of Cortec Group Fund VII in November 2019, Mr. Schafler moved to the role of “Founding Partner”.  The firm is currently led by Co-Presidents Messrs. Schnadig and Lipsitz.

After investing private capital since inception, Cortec raised its first institutional fund in 1990. In 2019, Cortec raised its seventh institutional fund, hitting its hard cap of $2.1 billion after only two months on the fund-raising trail. According to third-party fund reporting sources, under its current leadership, Cortec’s realized funds have delivered top quartile or decile returns to its investors.  Cortec delivered noteworthy success with its investment in YETI Holdings, Inc., which is reported to have returned >26x invested capital to its limited partners and has generated returns of >4x invested capital on a number of its other investments.  Importantly, the firm has written off $0 since 1999 and has permanently written down only two investments during that period.  Approximately 95% of the firm’s invested capital has generated positive returns.

Assets 
Cortec VII:
Groundworks
Enthusiast Auto Holdings
Cortec VI:
 Center for Vein Restoration
 Chauvet
 EVP EyeCare
 Groome Transportation
 Window Nation
 Aspen Medical Products
 Rotating Machinery Services
 Companion Pet Partners
 Lap of Love Veterinary Hospice 
 Cortec V:
 YETI (exited)
 Harmar
 Barcodes Inc. (exited)
 Canadian Hospital Specialties
 Weiman Products (exited)
 Vidaris (exited)
 Urnex (exited)
 Community Veterinary Partners (exited)

References

External links

Recent news

Private equity firms of the United States
Financial services companies established in 1984
Companies based in New York City